is a Japanese freestyle skier. She participates in moguls and dual moguls.

Her family moved to Hakuba town, Nagano Prefecture, Japan in 1986. She graduated from Hakuba High School in 1998, and works for the Kitano Construction Corporation in Nagano city, Japan.

She is the first Japanese woman to win the 2007–08 World Cup in moguls, and also won two gold medals at FIS Freestyle World Ski Championships 2009. She took part in the Winter Olympic Games in 1998, 2002, 2006, 2010, and 2014.

In June 2009, she married alpine skier Kentaro Minagawa.

At the 2014 Sochi Olympics, she was beaten for bronze by Hannah Kearney, the previous Olympic champion.

External links 

1979 births
Living people
Olympic freestyle skiers of Japan
Freestyle skiers at the 1998 Winter Olympics
Freestyle skiers at the 2002 Winter Olympics
Freestyle skiers at the 2006 Winter Olympics
Freestyle skiers at the 2010 Winter Olympics
Freestyle skiers at the 2014 Winter Olympics
People from Itami, Hyōgo
Japanese female freestyle skiers
Asian Games medalists in freestyle skiing
Asian Games gold medalists for Japan
Freestyle skiers at the 2003 Asian Winter Games
Medalists at the 2003 Asian Winter Games
Recipients of the Medal with Purple Ribbon